Chullpiri (Aymara chullpa an ancient funerary building, -(i)ri a suffix) is a  mountain in the Andes of Bolivia east of Poopó Lake. It is located in the Oruro Department, Sebastián Pagador Province, which is identical to the Santiago de Huari Municipality. Chullpiri lies southeast of Wila Sirka and Sirk'i and northeast of Ch'alla Phujru. It is situated south of the Anta Qullu valley.

References 

Mountains of Oruro Department